The Hawker Horsley was a British single-engined biplane bomber of the 1920s. It was the last all-wooden aircraft built by Hawker Aircraft, and served as a medium day bomber and torpedo bomber with Britain's Royal Air Force between 1926 and 1935, as well as the navies of Greece and Denmark.

Design and development
The Horsley (named after Sir Thomas Sopwith's home of Horsley Towers) was originally designed to meet Air Ministry Specification 26/23 for a day bomber powered by a single Rolls-Royce Condor engine. While the specification called for any production aircraft to be of metal construction, Hawker proposed to build the prototype of wooden construction, gradually switching to a metal structure during production. This was acceptable to the Air Ministry, and an order for a single prototype was placed. The first prototype was flown in March 1925, powered by a  engine, and was delivered to the Aeroplane and Armament Experimental Establishment at Martlesham Heath on 4 May 1925.

Meanwhile, the Air Ministry revised its requirements, producing Specification 23/25 which increased the required payload from one to two  bombs. At the same time, it also issued Specification 24/25 for a torpedo bomber, required to carry a  torpedo. The Horsley's ability to cope with the increased loads required to meet these new specifications led to the design being favoured by the RAF, with an initial order of forty aircraft, consisting of ten wooden Mk Is and 30 Mk IIs of mixed metal and wood construction, being placed.

Description
The Horsley was a large single-engined two-bay biplane. It had a crew of two, comprising a pilot and a gunner/bomb-aimer/radio operator, who had a .303 in (7.7 mm) Lewis gun mounted in a Scarff ring in the rear cockpit and a prone position for bomb aiming. The rear cockpit was also fitted with dual controls. The payload included two  bombs, one  bomb or a torpedo weighing .

The structure was originally all wood, but before production was complete an all-metal structure was introduced, made in what became the famous Hawker system of metal construction.  The three methods of construction were designated: Horsley Mk I for the all-wooden aircraft, Horsley Mk II for the mixed material, and (unofficially) Horsley III for the all-metal aircraft. Some aircraft were fitted with floats.

Two aircraft, known as the Hawker Dantorp and powered by Leopard II engines were sold to the Danish Government. They had a slightly different fuselage, accommodating a third crew member. The Danes also purchased a licence to build a further ten aircraft at the Danish Naval Workshops (Orlogsvaerftet), but these were not built owing to a shortage of funds.

Production aircraft were powered by the Condor IIIA, but the Horsley was also much used as a flying testbed for other engines, including the Napier Lion, Rolls-Royce Buzzard, Rolls-Royce Eagle, the Armstrong Siddeley Leopard radial engine, the Junkers Jumo diesel engine and early versions of the Rolls-Royce Merlin.

Operational history

The first aircraft were delivered to No 100 (Bomber) Squadron of the Royal Air Force in September 1927, with two more squadrons, No. 15 and No. 11 Squadrons receiving Horsleys by the end of the year, replacing the Fairey Fawn. The Horsleys proved greatly superior to the Fawn, carrying up to three times the bomb load over greater ranges and at higher speeds, while also being agile for their size, and were popular with their pilots.

In October 1928, No. 36 Squadron formed at Donibristle, Fife, Scotland as a torpedo-bomber squadron. It was transferred to Singapore in 1930, helping to suppress a rebellion in Burma as well as maintaining its torpedo bombing skills.  100 Squadron converted to the torpedo bombing role in 1930 to fill the gap in home-based defences.

The Horsley was chosen to attempt a non-stop flight to India, with a specially modified aircraft, carrying much more fuel and taking off at a weight of over 14,000 lb (6,350 kg) took off from RAF Cranwell on 20 May 1927, flown by Flight Lieutenants Roderick Carr and L.E.M Gillman. It ran out of fuel en route, however, ditching in the Persian Gulf near Bandar Abbas, Iran.

The Horsleys remained in service in the day-bombing role until 1934, with 504 Squadron's Horsleys being replaced by Westland Wallaces in March 1934. No 36 Squadron at Singapore retained the Horsely in the Torpedo bomber role until July 1935. The last Horsley, a Merlin-powered testbed flew its final flight at RAE Farnborough on 7 March 1938.

A total of 124 Horsleys were built, including six aircraft for the Hellenic Naval Air Service and the two related Dantorps built for Denmark.

Operators

 
 Marinens Flyvevæsen
 
 Hellenic Air Force
 Hellenic Naval Air Service
 
 Royal Air Force
 No. 11 Squadron RAF
 No. 15 Squadron RAF
 No. 25 Squadron RAF
 No. 33 Squadron RAF
 No. 36 Squadron RAF
 No. 100 Squadron RAF
 No. 504 Squadron RAF
 No. 1 Flying Training School RAF
 Royal Air Force College Cranwell
 Anti-Aircraft Cooperation Flight

Specification (Horsley II day bomber)

See also

References

Notes

Bibliography
 
 
 
 
 Thomas, Andrew. "In the Footsteps of Daedulus: Early Greek Naval Aviation". Air Enthusiast, No. 94, July–August 2001, pp. 8–9.

External links

 A history of Greek military equipment (1821-today): Hawker Horsley MkII
 Hawker Horsley – British Aircraft of World War II

1920s British bomber aircraft
Horsley
Single-engined tractor aircraft
Aircraft first flown in 1925
Biplanes